Fasarud Rural District is a rural district (dehestan) in the Central District of Darab County, Fars Province, Iran. At the 2006 census, its population was 8,531, in 1,988 families.  The rural district has 22 villages.

References 

Rural Districts of Fars Province
Darab County